Guy Cury (21 March 1930 – 16 March 2018) was a French hurdler who competed in the 1956 Summer Olympics.

References

1930 births
2018 deaths
People from Saint-Marcellin, Isère
French male hurdlers
Olympic athletes of France
Athletes (track and field) at the 1956 Summer Olympics
Sportspeople from Isère
Mediterranean Games gold medalists for France
Mediterranean Games medalists in athletics
Athletes (track and field) at the 1955 Mediterranean Games